Mighty Wurlitzer may refer to:
The Mighty Wurlitzer, a line of pipe organs made by Wurlitzer
Mighty Wurlitzer (media), a metaphor that CIA official Frank Wisner used to describe the Agency's influence on public opinion via various front organizations